Ju Ji-hoon (born May 16, 1982) is a South Korean actor and model. His first leading role was in the 2006 hit drama Princess Hours. His other notable works include The Devil, Antique, Mask, Along with the Gods: The Two Worlds and its sequel, The Spy Gone North, Dark Figure of Crime, Kingdom, and Jirisan.

Early life
In 2003, Ju debuted as a model, in advertisements for clothing brands such as Calvin Klein, Levi's and Reebok. He won many awards for modeling. Before entering the entertainment industry, he studied at Tongwon College, majoring in e-Business.

Career

2006–2008: Acting debut and recognition
Ju had various bit parts in television dramas, but it was in 2006's romantic comedy Princess Hours, based on the manhwa Goong, that he achieved breakthrough. The drama was a hit domestically with a peak rating of 28.3%, and internationally across Asia, catapulting Ju into Korean Wave stardom. He won the Best New Actor award at the MBC Drama Awards along with his co-star Yoon Eun-hye.

In March 2007, Ju starred in KBS2's revenge drama The Devil, opposite Uhm Tae-woong and Shin Min-a. The same month, he received the New Asian Star award at the 1st Astar TV Drama Awards for his performance in Princess Hours and The Devil.

Ju's film debut was in Antique (2008), based on the manga Antique Bakery. The film was invited to the 59th Berlin International Film Festival. He then reunited with The Devil co-star Shin Min-ah in the romantic comedy The Naked Kitchen.

2011–2016: Comeback
In January 2011, ahead of Ju's discharge in November, he signed with entertainment agency KeyEast, owned by actor Bae Yong-joon.

In August 2012, Ju made his comeback in the period comedy film I Am the King. Inspired by the popular novel The Prince and the Pauper, Ju played the dual role of Grand Prince Choong-nyung and the slave Deok-chil, in a fictional period before the prince becomes King Sejong the Great. This was followed by his starring role as a pianist in the melodrama Five Fingers, broadcast from August to November 2012. Joo also starred in medical drama Medical Top Team, and romantic comedy film Marriage Blue.

Ju made his film debut in China with Love Suspicion, a romantic thriller. In 2014, Ju was paired up with Ji Sung and Lee Kwang-soo in Confession, a neo-noir film that brutally explores the aftermath of three men's friendship after the death of one's mother.

In 2015, Ju starred in the period film The Treacherous, reuniting him with the director of Antique and Naked Kitchen. He then made his small screen comeback with SBS' melodrama Mask alongside Soo Ae.

In 2016, Ju starred in the noir crime thriller Asura: The City of Madness, which premiered globally at the 41st Toronto Film Festival. He received the Popular Film Star award at the Korea Top Star Awards.

2017–present: Career resurgence
From 2017 to 2018, Ju starred in the two-part fantasy epic Along With the Gods. The film was the second highest grossing film in South Korea, and Ju became known for his role as Haewonmaek.

In 2018, Ju starred in the thriller films The Spy Gone North, and Dark Figure of Crime. Ju's performance in both films earned acclaim, and he won several Best Supporting Actor awards at film ceremonies for his performance in The Spy Gone North, and was nominated for Best Actor at the Blue Dragon Awards for Dark Figure of Crime.

In 2019, Ju made a comeback to the small screen with two television series; Netflix's zombie period drama Kingdom, and MBC's fantasy legal drama Item.

In 2020, Ju reprised his role in the second season of Kingdom, and starred in the legal drama Hyena.

In January 2021, Ju signed with new agency H& Entertainment.

Conscription
On February 2, 2010, Ju enlisted in the Republic of Korea Army to serve his mandatory military service for five weeks of basic training at 306th draft in Uijeongbu of Gyeonggi Province, followed by active duty with the reserve forces.

In August, Ju co-starred with fellow actor Lee Joon-gi in the military musical Voyage of Life. The musical, to commemorate the 60th anniversary of the Korean War, was co-produced by the Ministry of National Defense and Korea Musical Theatre Association. It ran from August 21 to 29 at the National Theater of Korea. Ju was discharged on November 21, 2011.

Legal issues
On April 27, 2009, Ju was arrested by Seoul Metropolitan Police on drug charges. He was arrested along with 15 people and an actress identified as Yoon on suspicion of supplying ecstasy. On June 23, 2009, Ju pleaded guilty in court to drug use of ecstasy and ketamine. The judge explained, "The nature of the crime is by no means light. However, he has reflected deeply on the crime and has not taken any drugs since the time a year and two months ago. Also, many fans from within the country and from overseas have appealed for an appropriate handling of the matter and sent petitions." Ju's lawyer also stated, "Of course he must accept the price of his crime, but wrong information kept coming out and exaggerated him as a habitual user, and some of it was unfair."

Filmography

Film

Television series

Web series

Television shows

Web shows

Music video appearances

Awards and nominations

Listicles

References

External links

 
 

Living people
1982 births
Male actors from Seoul
South Korean male models
South Korean male film actors
South Korean male television actors
21st-century South Korean male actors